Desha County is a county located in the southeast part of the U.S. state of Arkansas, with its eastern border the Mississippi River. At the 2020 census, the population was 11,395. The county seat is Arkansas City. Located in the Arkansas Delta, Desha County's rivers and fertile soils became prosperous for planters under the cotton-based economy of plantation agriculture in the antebellum years and late 19th century. Still largely rural, it has suffered population losses and economic decline since the mid-20th century.

But following widespread farm mechanization, Desha County underwent a demographic and economic transformation. Farm workers left the area because of the lack of work, and there was a decline in population. Farm holdings have been consolidated into industrial style farms and the economy cannot support much activity. In the 21st century, the county is seeking to reverse population and economic losses through better education for its workforce, and developing tourism based on its cultural, historical and outdoor recreation amenities.

History
Desha County was created by the Arkansas Legislature on December 12, 1838, consisting of the lands of Arkansas County separated from the county seat by the Arkansas River and the White River, and land from Chicot County. The county was named for Captain Benjamin Desha, who fought in the War of 1812.

Located in the Arkansas Delta, Desha County's rivers and fertile soils prosperous for planters under the cotton-based slave society of plantation agriculture in the antebellum years. After the Civil War, cotton continued as the primary commodity crop into the early 20th century, and planters did well. Labor was provided by sharecroppers and tenant farmers.

But following widespread farm mechanization, laborers were thrown off the land, and Desha County had a demographic and economic transformation. Thousands of African-American farm workers left the area and went north or west in the Great Migration, and there was a decline in population. Farm holdings have been consolidated into industrial-scale farms, with few governmental benefits for small farmers, and the economy cannot support much activity. In the 21st century, the county is seeking to reverse population and economic losses through better education for its workforce, and developing tourism based on its cultural, historical and outdoor recreation amenities.

During World War II, the federal government established the Rohwer War Relocation Center, an internment camp for Japanese nationals and Japanese Americans it forced out of the coastal area of California, the U.S. Pacific Northwest, and Alaska. The camp operated from late 1942 into 1945 and the end of the war, holding up to nearly 8500 ethnic Japanese, many American-born citizens. The Rohwer War Relocation Center Cemetery has been designated as a National Historic Landmark.

Geography
Desha County is within the Arkansas Delta and is considered a member of the Southeast Arkansas region.

Major highways
 Future Interstate 69
 U.S. Highway 65
 U.S. Highway 165
 U.S. Highway 278
 Highway 1
 Highway 4
 Highway 138

Adjacent counties
 Arkansas County (north)
 Phillips County (northeast)
 Bolivar County, Mississippi (east)
 Chicot County (south)
 Drew County (southwest)
 Lincoln County (northwest)

National protected area
 White River National Wildlife Refuge (part)

Demographics

2020 census

As of the 2020 United States Census, there were 11,395 people, 5,204 households, and 3,545 families residing in the county.

2000 census
As of the 2000 census, there were 15,341 people, 5,922 households, and 4,192 families residing in the county.  The population density was 20 people per square mile (8/km2).  There were 6,663 housing units at an average density of 9 per square mile (3/km2).  The racial makeup of the county was 50.50% White, 46.33% Black or African American, 0.35% Native American, 0.30% Asian, 0.03% Pacific Islander, 1.73% from other races, and 0.76% from two or more races.  3.16% of the population were Hispanic or Latino of any race.

There were 5,922 households, out of which 34.60% had children under the age of 18 living with them, 46.50% were married couples living together, 19.90% had a female householder with no husband present, and 29.20% were non-families. 26.90% of all households were made up of individuals, and 12.70% had someone living alone who was 65 years of age or older.  The average household size was 2.57 and the average family size was 3.10.

In the county, the population was spread out, with 28.90% under the age of 18, 9.00% from 18 to 24, 25.20% from 25 to 44, 22.70% from 45 to 64, and 14.20% who were 65 years of age or older.  The median age was 36 years. For every 100 females, there were 87.60 males.  For every 100 females age 18 and over, there were 82.90 males.

The median income for a household in the county was $24,121, and the median income for a family was $30,028. Males had a median income of $29,623 versus $18,913 for females. The per capita income for the county was $13,446.  About 23.60% of families and 28.90% of the population were below the poverty line, including 39.60% of those under age 18 and 24.00% of those age 65 or over.

Government
Desha County is traditionally Democratic, and has remained so in recent years even as Arkansas as a whole has shifted to the Republican Party, voting for the Democratic nominee in every presidential election since 1972. In 2020, Joe Biden became the first Democrat since Walter Mondale to fall under 50% in the county, winning a plurality.

Communities

Cities
 Arkansas City (county seat)
 Dumas
 McGehee
 Mitchellville
 Tillar (partly in Drew County)
 Watson

Towns
 Reed

Unincorporated areas
 Back Gate
 Halley
 Kelso
 Pea Ridge
 Pickens
 Rohwer
 Snow Lake

Historic community
 Napoleon

Townships

 Bowie (most of McGehee)
 Clayton (Reed, Tillar, small part of McGehee)
 Franklin (Arkansas City)
 Halley (small part of McGehee)
 Jefferson
 Mississippi
 Randolph (Mitchellville, most of Dumas)
 Red Fork (Watson)
 Richland 
 Silver Lake
 Walnut Lake

Notable people
 John "Kayo" Dottley
 Jim Hines
 John H. Johnson
 Major Jones
 Doug Terry
 Barry Williamson

See also

 List of lakes in Desha County, Arkansas
 National Register of Historic Places listings in Desha County, Arkansas

References

 
1838 establishments in Arkansas
Populated places established in 1838
Arkansas counties on the Mississippi River
Internment camps for Japanese Americans
Majority-minority counties in Arkansas